Wares Creek is a  stream in Manatee County, Florida. The stream drains into the Manatee River. The creek's name is used by the Wares Creek neighborhood along its downstream path near downtown Bradenton. Neighborhood association activities have included a cleanup of the creek. A canoe trail was proposed alongside it. The Wares Creek Bridge along Manatee Avenue crosses Wares Creek.

History

The name's origin comes from Elbridge Ware who moved down to the area from Tallahassee with his wife in 1845. Ware's home was destroyed in a hurricane the following year resulting in the Ware's family to move back to Tallahassee.

In 2011, money was allocated dredge the creek for flood control.

Approximately  of wastewater entered the creek in 2019 when a sewer main broke.

References

Rivers of Manatee County, Florida
Geography of Manatee County, Florida